Saadeh v. Farouki, 107 F.3d 52 (D.C. Cir. 1997), was a case decided in the D.C. Circuit that espoused a narrow reading of 28 U.S.C. § 1332(a) in order to limit federal diversity jurisdiction.

Factual background

Saadeh, a Greek citizen living in Maryland, sued Farouki, a Jordanian citizen with permanent resident status in Maryland, over an unpaid debt in federal court.  The district court found for Saadeh, and Farouki appealed on the merits.

Decision

The court reversed the judgment, citing that the lower federal court lacked jurisdiction because of a lack of diversity.  The court reasoned that 28 U.S.C. §1332(a) was not intended to allow federal jurisdiction over a suit between two non-citizens.

References

External links
 

1997 in United States case law
Diversity jurisdiction case law
United States Court of Appeals for the District of Columbia Circuit cases